Cornish Hero first appeared in easily accessible records when Captain John Hartney acquired a letter of marque on 4 March 1797. She had a burthen of 182 tons and a crew of 80 men, indicating that she was a privateer. She carried fourteen 6–pounder guns and eight swivel guns. On 20 March he sailed from Falmouth on a cruise.

The  captured Cornish Hero in the Mediterranean in late 1797 and took her into Corfu  (Corcyre in French),. The French Navy took her into service as Corcyre. Corcyre, armed with 10 guns, then escorted convoys departing from Corsica and bound for Egypt to support the French campaign in Egypt and Syria.

On 1 or 2 June 1798  captured the 16-gun Corcyre off Sardinia. Corcyre was the former Cornish Hero. Her commander was Lieutenant de vaisseau Renault. Corcyre was part of the French fleet sailing to take Malta. The French fleet left Genoa and Citavechia Roads 20–21 May. Corcyre was sailing ahead of the fleet towards Marettimo when Flora captured her.

The Royal Navy did not take her into service. Cornish Herobecame a West Indiaman that was wrecked at Martinique early in 1800. She was on a voyage from Liverpool to the West Indies.

Notes

Citations

References
 
  
 
  
 

1790s ships
Privateer ships of the United Kingdom
Captured ships
Ships of the French Navy
Age of Sail merchant ships of England
Maritime incidents in 1800
Shipwrecks in the Caribbean Sea